The Church of Jesus Christ of Latter-day Saints holds a number of sites as historically significant. This list is intended as a quick reference for these sites. The sites may or may not be owned by the church.

In addition, independent historic registries have recognized a number of current or formerly church-associated properties, such as the L.D.S. Ward Building in Lava Hot Springs, Idaho, listed on the U.S. National Register of Historic Places.

Northeast

Palmyra

Kirtland

Other Northeast

Midwest

Nauvoo

Missouri

Other Midwest

West

Salt Lake City

Other West

Non-U.S.

See also

Mormon Corridor
Mormon Historic Sites Foundation
Mormon Pioneer National Heritage Area

References 
 
 

History of religion in the United States
List of historic sites
 
 
United States religion-related lists